The Oakland Cannabis Buyers' Cooperative (OCBC) is a California organization whose mission is to "provide seriously ill patients with a safe and reliable source of medical cannabis information and patient support." In order to become a member, a person must provide a note from a treating physician assenting to cannabis therapy for a medical condition listed on the Medicinal Cannabis User Initial Questionnaire. Those conditions range from severe disabilities such as multiple sclerosis and cerebral palsy to relatively minor conditions such as menstrual cramps.

To protect the OCBC from federal interference, Oakland, California established growing and possession guidelines and declared the OCBC an agent of the city. On May 14, 2001, however, the United States Supreme Court ruled in United States v. Oakland Cannabis Buyers' Coop that federal anti-drug laws do not permit an exception for medical marijuana.

References
Chorney, Jeff: Pot Raids Stir SF Protests, Oakland Tribune, Feb. 13, 2002.
US Supreme Court Upholds Bankrupt Federal Law on Medical Marijuana - State Law Not Affected, California NORML, May 14, 2001.

External links
 *Oakland Cannabis Buyers Cooperative 

Medicinal use of cannabis organizations based in the United States
Consumers' cooperatives in the United States
Cannabis in California